Lush 99.5FM was a radio station which plays a distinct brand of music, consisting of Indie, Independent and Electronic music. It started transmission on 31 December 2004 at 7.25am before airing subsequently from 7am to 2am daily. It was extended to broadcast throughout the entire day from 20 January 2005.

Lush 99.5FM was the first English radio station in Singapore to be located in a shopping mall (Orchard Central #02-02), and was also the first Mediacorp radio station to move out of Caldecott Hill on 20 August 2009. Lush 99.5FM's last day of tenancy at Orchard Central was 7 July 2012; the station has since moved back to Caldecott Hill. Lush 99.5FM moved again to the brand new Mediacorp Campus, Mediapolis @ one-north, on 17 January 2017.

Every week, various guest DJs would be invited on The Lush Mix, which airs on Saturdays from 8pm and repeats on weekdays from 9pm.

Lush 99.5FM has ceased transmission since 1 September 2017 as part of a rationalization of Mediacorp's network of radio stations.

Staff

Directorial Staff
 Head, Women Men Parents (Customer Group): Jessie Sng
 Asst Programme Director: Vanessa Fernandez
 Music Director: Jeremy Phua

DJs

Weekdays
 Rosalyn Lee (Rozz) – Lush Bites, 9am – 1pm
 Elias Soh – The Evening Lush, 5-9pm
 Tracy Phillips – The Lush Life
 Tammy Henderson – The Art of Lush
 Georgina Chang – 90 Seconds with Georgina Chang
 Vanessa Fernandez – The Lushloveslocal Show
 Chris Ho – The Gig Guide

Weekends
 Chris Ho – Clubscape, Saturday 5-8pm
 The Lush Mix, Saturday 8-9pm

See also
List of radio stations in Singapore

References

External links
 Lush 99.5FM Live

Radio stations in Singapore
Radio stations established in 2004
Radio stations disestablished in 2017
2004 establishments in Singapore
2017 disestablishments in Singapore